Cinnamomum cambodianum is a non-scented species of cinnamon, native and endemic to Cambodia. Commonly referred to as Cambodia cinnamon, C. cambodianum is an evergreen tree with a large, dense crown, growing 15–25 metres tall. The straight, cylindrical bole can grow to 30–80 cm in diameter.

Habitat and distribution 
Cinnamomum cambodianum is endemic to Cambodia and is  plentiful on the upper slopes of the Cardamom Mountains, including the Elephant Mountains, in the southwest of Cambodia. There are disjunct populations in Ratanakiri and Kampong Thom, in the northeast of the country.

This species of cinnamon grows in wet, dense, foothill forests from 600–700 m above sea level. When young, it is a shade-demanding tree and it grows well in deep soil. It usually grows in clusters of 5–10 trees in the primary of secondary forest, at altitudes below 1,500 m above sea level. The gene-ecological zone for C. cambodianum is the central Annamites.

Uses 
In Cambodia, C. cambodianum is extensively harvested from the wild for local use as a food condiment, traditional medicine, and source of wood. The wood is a highly valued timber in Cambodia, normally used for house construction. The bark is sometimes chewed with betel. In Khmer traditional medicine, the bark is believed to be effective against indigestion, tuberculosis, and for regulation of menstruation. For animals it is used as a carminative and digestive. C. cambodianum has shown significant anti-allergic properties in laboratory tests.

C. cambodianum is a non-scented species of cinnamon, but all parts of the stem are aromatic. Commercially, the bark of this tree is often used in China for the production of non-scented incense sticks.

Bioactive compounds 
Cinnamomum cambodianum contains significant concentrations of cinnamaldehyde and eugenol in its volatile oils.

Conservation 
Although this species has not been assessed for the IUCN Red List, Cinnamomum cambodianum has come under high pressure from over-exploitation and is considered in danger of extinction unless measures are taken to provide adequate protection from illegal logging. The number of mature trees has been reduced significantly and it is difficult to find enough useful sources of germplasm.

In 2009, C. cambodianum was estimated to be at threat level 4 (where 5 is the most severe) by Bioversity International and others.

See also 
 Deforestation in Cambodia

Sources 
 Useful Tropical Plants: Cinnamomum cambodianum
 Cambodia Tree Seed Project (April 2004, p. 45-46): Cinnamomum cambodianum Lecomte

References 

cambodianum
Endemic flora of Cambodia
Trees of Cambodia
Plants described in 1913